Applied and Computational Harmonic Analysis is a bimonthly peer-reviewed scientific journal published by Elsevier. The journal covers studies on the applied and computational aspects of harmonic analysis. Its editors-in-chief are Ronald Coifman (Yale University) and David Donoho (Stanford University).

Abstracting and indexing
The journal is abstracted and indexed in:
CompuMath Citation Index
Current Contents/Engineering, Computing & Technology
Current Contents/Physical, Chemical & Earth Sciences
Inspec
Scopus
Science Citation Index Expanded
Zentralblatt MATH

According to the Journal Citation Reports, the journal has a 2020 impact factor of 3.055.

References

External links

English-language journals
Publications established in 1993
Bimonthly journals
Elsevier academic journals
Computer science journals
Harmonic analysis